Girardville may refer to:

 Girardville, Pennsylvania, United States
 Girardville, Quebec, Canada